Vasum stephanti, common name the rhinoceros vase snail or rhinoceros vase shell, is a species of large predatory sea snail, a marine gastropod mollusk within the family Turbinellidae.

Description
The length of the shell attains 58 mm.

Distribution
This marine species occurs off Somalia

References

External links
 Emerson, W. K.; Sage III, W. E. (1988). A new species of Vasum (Gastropoda: Turbinellidae) from off Somalia. Nautilus. 102(1): 36-39

stephanti
Gastropods described in 1988